The Jureczki House, at 607 Cypress St. in Bandera, Texas, was built in 1876.  It was listed on the National Register of Historic Places in 1980.

It is a two-story plastered stone house which is one of the largest Polish pioneer houses in central Texas.

References

		
National Register of Historic Places in Bandera County, Texas
Houses completed in 1876